GPD XD is an Android-based handheld game console produced by the Chinese company GamePad Digital, released in late 2015. It is similar in form to a Nintendo 3DS XL, has a single, capacitive touch-screen, and is optimized for running emulators and other native Android software. It was succeeded by the GPD XD Plus, which has a smoother hinge and runs on Android 7.

Software 

Android 4.4.4 is installed as standard, including a Metro-inspired launcher, game emulators and apps. The stock system software can be replaced with newer, community-based versions such as LegacyROM, removing unnecessary or infringing apps, adding Google Play, improving the performance of some emulators and enabling root access as well as overclocking to 1.8 GHz.

A virtual control mapper utility is included in all versions of the system software, allowing the use of the physical controls with games that do not natively support them.

Hardware 

The GPD XD contains a Rockchip RK3288 SoC, which consists of an ARM Cortex-A17 clocked at 1.4 GHz, paired with the Mali-T764, which is clocked at 600 MHz. This allows the XD to be used for native 3D accelerated Android games as well as emulation, which is the device's main selling point. The device's power allows it to emulate systems up to the Sega Dreamcast and Nintendo DS, albeit with varying levels of quality. The system also has 2 GB of DDR3-SDRAM and a 720p display.

See also 

 GamePad Digital
 GPD Win
 GPD Win 2
 GPD Win Max
 Handheld gaming

References

External links
GamePad Digital official website (English)

ARM-based video game consoles
Android-based video game consoles
Products introduced in 2015
Handheld game consoles